Greater Kailash (often referred to as GK) is a residential area in South Delhi consisting of several neighborhoods and multiple markets. It is divided into two zones, namely Parts 1, 2, and 3, located around a section of the Outer Ring Road. The neighborhood registered a 4.4% growth in residential sales.

Greater Kailash 1

Greater Kailash 1 (GK-I) was developed in the 1960s by DLF Limited when Delhi Government allowed private developers to build colonies and is today one of the most affluent neighborhoods in the city, home to well-known politicians, business personality and people associated with Bollywood industry. GK 1 markets in M and N Block are some of the most popular markets among Delhites and tourists because of its wide range of shopping, restaurants, bars, etc. The Office of ASSOCHAM was there in Zamrudpur Community Centre till May 2013.

Greater Kailash Part 2
The development of Greater Kailash-I was followed by the expansion of Greater Kailash Part II, which has easier accessibility to the Outer Ring Road of New Delhi. M-Block, GK II is a popular market, with many restaurants, coffee shops, sanitary shops and beauty salons. It is one of the largest hubs for sanitary ware in Northern India. Recently the market has experienced heavy footfall due to several restaurants, salons and banks.

Greater Kailash Part 3
The development of Greater Kailash-II has also led to its expansion into Greater Kailash-III, now bordering GK-II and adjacent to the Greater Kailash Metro station.

Real Estate
Established in the early 1960s, the Greater Kailash locality has two metro stations on the violet and magenta lines. It has its own prime market which hosts numerous opulent salons, boutiques and eating joints. Property prices have always been high in this borough due to the numerous facilities available. Builder floors and independent villas cost anywhere between INR 6-25 crores (the US $800,000 - $9,000,000). Rental rates are also very high due to which this residential area is among the most expensive places of New Delhi.

Educational institutions
Balvantray Mehta Vidya Bhawan Anguridevi Shersingh Memorial Academy
 Don Bosco School
 Summer Fields School
 K R Mangalam
 After School Academy

Hospitals
 Shekhawati Hospital
 Apollo Spectra Hospital
 Fortis La Femme Hospital
 Sukhda Hospital
 Phoenix Hospital 
 Premier Skin Hospital
 Bharti Eye Hospital
 Spectra Eye Hospital
 AJ Kanwar Skin Hospital

Religious buildings 
 Gurdwara Sri Guru Singh Sabha (Greater Kailash)
∆ Sanatan Dharm Mandir
∆ Arya Samaj Mandir
∆ Church

Accessibility
 The Domestic Airport is 17 km from Greater Kailash.
 The International Airport (IGI) is 22 km from Greater Kailash.
 The Nizamuddin Railway station is approximately 9 km from Greater Kailash
 The New Delhi Railway Station is approximately 15 – 16 km from Greater Kailash

Contiguous Neighborhoods

 East of Kailash
 Nehru Place
 Lajpat Nagar
 Kalkaji
 Chittaranjan Park
 Masjid Moth
 Greater Kailash 3
 Kailash Colony
 Sant Nagar
 Pamposh Enclave
 Hemkunt Colony
 Chirag Enclave
 Siri Fort Road
 Alaknanda
 tughlaqabad extension
 Govind puri

References

External Links 
Nehru Place Distributors 
Nehru Place

Neighbourhoods in Delhi
South Delhi district